America Latina is a 2021 Italian drama film directed by Damiano and Fabio D'Innocenzo. It was selected to compete for the Golden Lion at the 78th Venice International Film Festival.

Cast
 Elio Germano as Massimo Sisti

References

External links
 

2021 films
2021 drama films
Italian drama films
2020s Italian-language films
2020s Italian films